List of FC Kairat seasons

Soviet era

Domestic history 

FC Kairat seasons